William McCafferty (9 December 1882 – 17 April 1929) was a Scottish professional footballer who played in the Scottish Football League for Celtic and in the Football League for Bolton Wanderers and Birmingham. He played as a forward.

Career
McCafferty was born in Rutherglen, which was then in Lanarkshire. He played for junior club Rutherglen Glencairn before signing for Celtic in March 1902. He made his first team debut on the losing side in the 1902 Scottish Cup Final, and played once in the Scottish League, in October 1902 in a 1–1 home draw with Rangers, before joining English club Bolton Wanderers on loan the following month. McCafferty went back to Scotland to play for Stenhousemuir and Bathgate before returning to England for a season in the Southern League with Reading. In December 1906, First Division club Birmingham signed McCafferty for the value of the gate receipts from a friendly between buying and selling club, which amounted to £350 (£ today).. The player scored in that friendly, but failed to score in competitive play for Birmingham, as he could not dislodge Benny Green from the side. McCafferty went on to play for Southern League clubs Portsmouth and Brentford between further spells at Bathgate.

McCafferty died while at work in Rutherglen in 1929.

References

1882 births
1929 deaths
Sportspeople from Rutherglen
Scottish footballers
Association football forwards
Rutherglen Glencairn F.C. players
Celtic F.C. players
Bolton Wanderers F.C. players
Stenhousemuir F.C. players
Bathgate F.C. players
Reading F.C. players
Birmingham City F.C. players
Portsmouth F.C. players
Brentford F.C. players
Scottish Junior Football Association players
Scottish Football League players
English Football League players
Southern Football League players
Dunfermline Athletic F.C. players
Footballers from South Lanarkshire